The 1994 Slick 50 300 was the 16th stock car race of the 1994 NASCAR Winston Cup Series season and the 36th iteration of the event. The race was held on Saturday, July 2, 1994, in Loudon, New Hampshire, at New Hampshire International Speedway, a  permanent, oval-shaped, low-banked racetrack. The race took the scheduled 300 laps to complete. On the final restart of the race with eight laps to go, Ricky Rudd, driving for his own Rudd Performance Motorsports team would manage to hold off the field to take his 15th career NASCAR Winston Cup Series victory and his only victory of the season. Meanwhile, second-place finisher, Richard Childress Racing driver Dale Earnhardt would retake the overall driver's championship lead after a poor finish from then-points leader Ernie Irvan. To fill out the top three, Penske Racing South driver Rusty Wallace would finish third.

Background 

New Hampshire International Speedway is a 1.058-mile (1.703 km) oval speedway located in Loudon, New Hampshire which has hosted NASCAR racing annually since the early 1990s, as well as an IndyCar weekend and the oldest motorcycle race in North America, the Loudon Classic. Nicknamed "The Magic Mile", the speedway is often converted into a 1.6-mile (2.6 km) road course, which includes much of the oval. The track was originally the site of Bryar Motorsports Park before being purchased and redeveloped by Bob Bahre. The track is currently one of eight major NASCAR tracks owned and operated by Speedway Motorsports.

Entry list 

 (R) denotes rookie driver.

Qualifying 
Qualifying was split into two rounds. The first round was held on Friday, July 8, at 3:30 PM EST. Each driver would have one lap to set a time. During the first round, the top 20 drivers in the round would be guaranteed a starting spot in the race. If a driver was not able to guarantee a spot in the first round, they had the option to scrub their time from the first round and try and run a faster lap time in a second round qualifying run, held on Saturday, July 9, at 11:00 AM EST. As with the first round, each driver would have one lap to set a time. For this specific race, positions 21-40 would be decided on time, and depending on who needed it, a select amount of positions were given to cars who had not otherwise qualified but were high enough in owner's points; up to two provisionals were given. If needed, a past champion who did not qualify on either time or provisionals could use a champion's provisional, adding one more spot to the field.

In the second round, Junior Johnson & Associates driver Bill Elliott would manage to beat his time with a time of 29.755; however, since the time was in the second round, Elliott would only garner the 21st starting position.

Fiver drivers would fail to qualify.

Full qualifying results

Race results

Standings after the race 

Drivers' Championship standings

Note: Only the first 10 positions are included for the driver standings.

References 

1994 NASCAR Winston Cup Series
NASCAR races at New Hampshire Motor Speedway
July 1994 sports events in the United States
1994 in sports in New Hampshire